ProRepeat is a database of protein repeats.

See also
 Tandem repeat

References

External links
 http://prorepeat.bioinformatics.nl/

Biological databases
Protein structure